Thiotricha attenuata is a moth of the family Gelechiidae. It was described by Mikhail Mikhailovich Omelko in 1993. It is found in Japan.

The wingspan is about 12 mm.

References

Moths described in 1993
Thiotricha